Tom Morgan (born October 21) is an American comic book artist known primarily for his work on Marvel Comics' Captain America, The Punisher 2099, Excalibur and Iron Man.

Career
Morgan broke into the industry in the early 1980s and worked on a large number of Marvel titles, mostly as a fill-in artist, for such books as Captain America, Star Brand, West Coast Avengers, Star Trek, and Power Pack. In the mid-1990s, he worked on Punisher 2099 and Iron Man for Marvel; and Extreme Justice and both the Action Comics and The Adventures of Superman titles for DC Comics.

In November 1995, ReganBooks released Miss America, the second book by radio and media personality Howard Stern, which includes a five-page comic book story, written and drawn by Morgan. It was printed as a glossy paper insert, and features Stern's satirical superhero, Fartman. Morgan's story is based on the screenplay by J.F. Lawton for an unproduced Fartman film.

Morgan drew Jeff Mariotte's biography of Barack Obama, which was released in late 2008 by IDW Publishing.

Bibliography 
 West Coast Avengers #38, 41, 58, 71, 100 (Marvel, 1989/1991/1993)
 Captain America #330, 332-338, 350 (Marvel, 1987–1988)
 Punisher 2099 #1-11, 13, 15-19, 25, 32-34 (Marvel, 1993–1995)
 Iron Man #289, 298, 300, 307-319 (Marvel, 1993–1995)
 Extreme Justice #12-18 (DC, 1996)

Notes

References

External links

Year of birth missing (living people)
Living people
American comics artists